Flaviu Cristian (25 June 1951 – 27 April 1999) was a Romanian-American computer scientist noted for his work in distributed systems and, in particular, the development of a method for clock synchronisation which bears his name, Cristian's algorithm.

Biography
He was born in 1951 in Cluj, in the Transylvania region of Romania, the son of Ilie and Rafila Cristian. After graduating from the Nicolae Bălcescu High School in his native city, he went in 1971 to France to study at the Grenoble Institute of Technology, in the Department of Applied Mathematics and Computer Science. After graduating in 1977 from both the Institute and the Grenoble School of Management, he pursued his graduate studies in computer science at the University of Grenoble, where he carried out research in operating systems and programming methodology, and received his Ph.D. in 1979.

Cristian went on to the University of Newcastle upon Tyne in the United Kingdom, where he worked in the area of specification, design, and verification of fault-tolerant software. In 1982 he emigrated to the United States, joining the IBM Research Center in Almaden Valley, in San Jose, California. In 1991 he joined the University of California, San Diego as Professor in the Department of Computer Science and Engineering.

He died in San Diego in 1999 after a long battle with cancer.

Publications

See also
 Cristian's algorithm

Notes

External links 
 UCSD Jacobs: Flaviu Cristian, Professor and Scientist, Dies at Age 48
 List of computer science publications by Cristian Flavius

1951 births
1999 deaths
Romanian computer scientists
Grenoble Alpes University alumni
University of California, San Diego faculty
Romanian emigrants to the United States
Scientists from Cluj-Napoca
Romanian expatriates in France
Romanian expatriates in the United Kingdom
IBM Research computer scientists
Grenoble Institute of Technology alumni
Deaths from cancer in California